Găvănești is a commune in Olt County, Oltenia, Romania. It is composed of four villages: Băleasa, Broșteni, Dâmburile and Găvănești. These were part of Baldovinești Commune until 2004, when they were split off.

References

Communes in Olt County
Localities in Oltenia